"Love Has Gone" is a song by Belgian drum and bass producer Netsky. The song was released on 30 July 2012 as a digital download in the United Kingdom from his second album 2. The song entered the UK Singles Chart at number 182 and also charted in Belgium. The song, produced by Boris Daenen, is based on a sample of the song "Love Ballad" by L.T.D., which was written by Skip Scarborough.

Music video
A music video to accompany the release of "Love Has Gone" was first released onto YouTube on 25 June 2012 at a total length of four minutes and fifteen seconds. Produced and directed by Kash Black the video location is Barcelona.

Track listings

Chart performance

Release history

References

2012 singles
Netsky (musician) songs
Songs written by Skip Scarborough
2012 songs
Hospital Records singles